The Khadgamala ("Garland of the Sword") is an invocational mantra that names each of the Devi Hindu goddesses according to their place in the Sri Yantra or in the Maha Meru. This list of divine names is described poetically as a "garland". The sword (Sanskrit: khaḍga) is an epithet for the Devi's "power to strike down desire, hatred, and delusion".

This recitation of mantra is a spiritual practice of Hindu tantra.

Guru Karunamaya delivered a series of talks in English on Sri Sankara TV on Sri Devi Khadgamala revealing the inner meaning of the Shri Yantra and Lalitha Tripura Sundari.

See also

References

External links 

 Khadagmala mantra and explanation

Shaktism
Spiritual practice
Tantra